Guanziling station is a subway station in Changsha, Hunan, China, operated by the Changsha subway operator Changsha Metro.

Station layout
The station has one island platform.

History
Construction began on July 13, 2015. The station opened on 26 May 2019.

Surrounding area
 Changsha Medical University
 Hunan University of Technology and Commerce
 High School Affiliated to Hunan Normal University
 The Moon Island

References

Railway stations in Hunan
Railway stations in China opened in 2019